Karl Vetter (April 15, 1895 in Todtnau – ?) was a German politician in the NSDAP during World War II.

Early life
Vetter studied agriculture from 1910 to 1914. He became a manager. In 1919, he became an independent farmer in Wanfried.

He participated as a volunteer in the First World War. He was discharged as a lieutenant. After the war he became national chairman of the country's peasantry Hesse-Cassel and held a senior position at Berliner Volks-Zeitung.

Career 
In 1932 he became a member of the Prussian Parliament for the NSDAP. Vetter served as county commissioner, the Reich Office for eggs, served in the Prussian Ministry of Food and Agriculture, was Special Envoy for the Small Animal Breeding and finally President of the Association of German small animal breeders.

Vetter ranked number 665 in the elections to the German Reichstag on 12 November 1933. He remained a member of the Nazi Reichstag, until the end of the Nazi regime in the spring of 1945.

In 1938 he was Standartenführer.

In an experiment conducted as part of the American military government denazification process (Ref.: HHStAW Abt 520 Kassel Central No. 3230 [K271]) Karl Vetter as labeled "Loaded" II classified. On 10 July 1948, he was released from the detention center in Darmstadt.

On May 7, 1951, he was released from Wanfried, Hesse, Hamburg. From there he moved on August 20, 1951 to Buenos Aires, Argentina. In 1955, Vetter requested a Certificate of Origin for applying for a war disability pension in Germany.

References

1895 births
19th-century German politicians
Year of death missing